The Legaliteti were an Albanian royalist and pro-monarchy faction founded in
1941. It was led by Abaz Kupi.

Ideology

The Legaliteti sought the return of King Zog, who had fled the country on the eve of the Italian invasion. The Legaliteti consisted of supporters from mostly the northern mountain tribes, particularly the Mati region.
The Legaliteti were anti-communist. Despite being nationalistic, the Legaliteti were against the Balli Kombëtar as the Balli Kombëtar were the social democrats and pro-republic while the Legaliteti were loyalists and royalists. The Balli Kombëtar were also accused by the Legality because they supported the German occupation. However, within the Balli Kombetar there were pro-Monarchist elements.

History

The negative action of the Albanian Communists on the Kosovo issue alienated a significant number of its adherents from that border region. Following November 1943, Abaz Kupi, until the Mukje Agreement, was a member of the Central Council of the NLM, withdrew with others to form the Legaliteti. Kupi was a respected Gheg chieftain who had commanded King Zog's troops in Durrës when the Italians invaded Albania. In the early 1940s, three new political factions emerged within Albania after the Italians were defeated: the Albanian Communists, Balli Kombëtar (National Front), and Legaliteti (Legality). The Allies originally supported the Legaliteti. Being the smallest faction with no significant influence in Albania, the Allies broke aid with the Legaliteti and aided the Yugoslav Partisans, who in turn backed the Albanian communists. In 1945, the Albanian communists assumed control over Albania at the end of World War II. Most Legaliteti members were executed or had escaped to the west.

Legacy

The monarchist Legality Movement Party takes its name from the group.

References

Further reading 

Histoire de l'Albanie et de sa maison royale (5 volumes); Patrice Najbor -  JePublie - Paris - 2008
 La dynastie des Zogu, Patrice Najbor -  Textes&Pretextes - Paris - 2002

External links

Official website of the Albanian Royal Court
Site Officiel de la Maison Royale d'Albanie
L'Albanie et le sauvetage des Juifs

1941 establishments in Albania
Albanian militant groups
Albanian monarchists
Political parties established in 1941
Albania in World War II
Anti-communist organizations in Albania
Albanian Resistance
Monarchism in Albania